Nine Winds is an American jazz record label that was founded in 1977 by Vinny Golia.

Golia is a self-taught musician who plays over fifty woodwind instruments, in addition to brass. In the early 1970s, he believed it was impossible for musicians who lived outside New York City to get contracts with record labels. He founded Nine Winds to produce his own albums and that of others who played free jazz, avant-garde jazz, and other forms of avant-garde music that were difficult to sell. He issued several of his own albums, then the debut album by guitarist Nels Cline. The roster grew to include unconventional music by Alex Cline, Jeff Gauthier, and Wayne Peet.

Roster

 Aardvark Jazz Orchestra
 Steve Adams
 Susan Allen
 Eric Barber
 Bonnie Barnett
 Bill Barrett
 John Bergamo
 Dick Berk
 Ron Blakeslee
 Bobby Bradford
 Ellen Burr
 Paul Carman
 John Carter
 Luciano Chessa
 Alex Cline
 Nels Cline
 Mark Dresser
 Brad Dutz
 Harris Eisenstadt
 Eric Von Essen
 Ken Filiano
 Stephen Flinn
 Bruce Fowler
 Lori Freedman
 Wolfgang Fuchs
 John Fumo
 Jeff Gauthier
 Matthew Goodheart
 Vinny Golia
 Jonathan Golove
 Phillip Greenlief
 John Gross
 Richard Grossman
 Rich Halley
 Joel Hamilton
 Edwin Harkins
 Rick Helzer
 Anna Homler
 Trey Henry
 David Earle Johnson
 Jeff Kaiser
 Kaoru
 Carla Kihlstedt
 Ronit Kirchman
 Larry Koonse
 Marilyn Lerner
 George Lewis
 Steuart Liebig
 Tony Malaby
 Billy Mintz
 Giorgio Occhipinti
 Andrew Pask
 Wayne Peet
 Barre Phillips
 John Rapson
 Kim Richmond
 Bob Rodriguez
 William Roper
 Ken Rosser
 Wadada Leo Smith
 Paul Smoker
 G.E. Stinson
 Mark Trayle
 Bertram Turetzky
 Johnnie Valentino
 Michael Vlatkovich
 Scott Walton
 Mark Weber
 Tad Weed
 Jeanette Wrate

References

External links 
 Nine Winds: Blowing Hot Out of LA. Allaboutjazz.com, April 6, 2005.

American record labels
Jazz record labels
Record labels established in 1977
1977 establishments in California
Record labels based in California